Xena Workwear is a Milwaukee-based women's workwear company specialized in stylish women's steel toe shoes and apparel. The company creates fashionable personal protective equipment (PPE) for women.

History 
In 2017, the founder of Xena Workwear, Anastasia (Ana) Kraft, came upon the idea to start a women's workwear company while working as a project manager in the manufacturing industry. In 2019, Xena Workwear was accepted into the accelerator program  run by Madison-based gener8tor. In May 2019, the company launched its first ASTM-certified product, the Gravity steel-toe safety shoe. Shortly afterwards, Xena Workwear closed a $750,000 seed round led by Chicago-based Starting Line.

Description 

Xena Workwear develops shoes for women working in non-traditional industries. The company uses Leather Working Group (LWG) certified leather in their products.

Partnerships & Endorsements 
Xena Workwear is an official partner and sponsor of the National Association of Women in Construction (NAWIC) and Women in Manufacturing (WIM).

The company also partners with organizations which further the mission of inspiring more women to explore careers in STEM and trades:

Reinvented Magazine - an organization focused on reinventing the general perception of women in STEM fields
Beauty and the Bolt - an organization teaching that engineering and femininity are not mutually exclusive
Her STEM Story - an organization sharing stories of female STEM professionals from around the world

In 2019, the company was endorsed by the Society of Women Engineers (SWE) FY20 President.

Xena Workwear is featured in the following publications, among others:

Metalforming Magazine - January 2020
 Quartz - February 2020
Chemical & Engineering News - April 2020
 Steel Times International - May 2020
Forbes - December 2020

The company was listed as a top 20 Wisconsin startup to watch in 2020 by Wisconsin Inno.

References

External links 
Official website
Urban Milwaukee
American Inno
Leather Working Group (LWG)
Metalforming Magazine
Steel Times International

American companies established in 2019
Footwear
Safety clothing
Clothing brands of the United States
Manufacturing companies based in Milwaukee
Manufacturing companies established in 2019